Syncopacma azosterella is a moth of the family Gelechiidae. It was described by Gottlieb August Wilhelm Herrich-Schäffer in 1854. It is found in Morocco, Portugal, Spain, France, Austria, the Czech Republic, Slovenia, Hungary, Bulgaria, Romania, Greece, Russia (southern Ural) and Ukraine.

References

Moths described in 1854
Syncopacma